Ayrens is a commune in the Cantal department in the Auvergne-Rhône-Alpes region of south-central France.

The inhabitants of the commune are known as Ayrencois or Ayrencoises.

Geography
Ayrens is located some 15 km north-west of Aurillac and 5 km north of Saint-Paul-des-Landes. Access to the commune is by road D52 from Teissières-de-Cornet in the south-east which passes through the village and continues west then south to join the D120 north-east of Laroquebrou. The D53 comes from Saint-Paul-des-Landes in the south and also passes through the village before continuing north-east to join the D6 near the border of the commune. The D352 goes north from the village to join the D53 north of the commune. Apart from the village there are the hamlets of:

Les Baraques
Le Bos Niac
Boutonnet
Cels
Ciels
Colin
La Croix-Longue
Jammes
Le Mont
Renac
Selves
Serieys
Tannuies
La Tronque

The commune is mainly farmland with extensive forests in the northern part.

The Ruisseau du Meyrou flows from the south-east through the south of the commune forming a small part of the western border before continuing north to join the Eize. The Ruisseau d'Ayrens rises in the east of the commune and flows west through the village to the join the Ruisseau du Meyrou on the western border of the commune. The Ruisseau de Braulle flows from the west of the commune through the centre north of the village to join the Ruisseau du Meyrou on the western border. The Ruisseau de Praniac rises in the north of the commune and forms part of the northern border as it flows west to join the Eize.

Neighbouring communes and villages

History
Ayrens commune lies on the Paris meridian and on the 45th parallel north. It was therefore the fundamental point for the Bonne projection used in the Carte d'État-Major (General Staff Map) in the 19th century.

Administration
List of Successive Mayors

Mayors from 1935

Demography
In 2017 the commune had 652 inhabitants.

Sites and monuments

The Château de Clavières, built in the Troubadour style, was burnt down on 25 May 1936 and left in ruins.
The Parc de Clavières is registered as an historical monument.

The intersection of the Paris meridian and the 45th parallel north is in a field where four trees were planted on the occasion of the celebration of the Méridienne verte (Green Meridian) on 14 July 2000. The trees are arranged in a square whose vertices are directed toward the four cardinal points, which allows the determination of the exact intersection point.

Notable people linked to the commune
Cardinal Guillaume de La Jugie, restored then lived in the Château of Angouste in the 14th century.
Félix de la Salle de Rochemaure (1856–1915), French félibrige writer, lived in the Château of Clavières.
Jean Léon Sanis (Ayrens 1804-?), geographer, professor at the Lycée Louis-le-Grand.

See also
Occitania
Félibrige
Pope Sylvester II
Auvergne (province), the historical independent county and later French province
Communes of the Cantal department

References

External links
Felibrige official website 
Ayrens on Géoportail, National Geographic Institute (IGN) website 
Aireins on the 1750 Cassini Map

Communes of Cantal